"Weapons of Moroland" is a plaque or crest containing miniature models of weapons used by warriors from the indigenous peoples of Mindanao in the Philippines. As a souvenir, it is fairly common in gift shops, and is considered a pop culture icon. Displaying the plaque in one's home is one of several indications of "how Filipino" one is. It is jokingly used as a description of resistance to colonialism.

The weapons on the wooden plaque include spears, shields, and a wide range of swords or knives such as the kris, barong and the kampilan, while the plaque itself is usually shaped like the Coat of arms of the Philippines, and is often though not always painted in the colors of that seal.

The quality of the models varies from case to case, usually reflecting the general shape of each weapon but not usually accurately showing the scale of blades with their hilts, nor the scale of weapons relative to each other.

Typically featured weapons

Blade weapons 
Balasiong
Bangkung (Bangkon)
Banjal
Barong
Budjak
Gunong (Punyal)
Janad
Kalis
Kambang
Kampilan
Kapa
Kris
Lahot
Laring
Gayang
Panabas
Pirah
Punyal
Susuwat
Utak

Shields 
Karasak
Sangkil
Taming

Spears 
Budjak

Others 
Agung - A musical instrument of the Kulintang ensemble, used as a signal to relay commands in battle.

Sources

External links 
 Message board topic showing images of actual swords portrayed in the plaque -- 

Philippine art
Weapons of the Philippines
Blade weapons